MAP kinase-interacting serine/threonine-protein kinase 2 is an enzyme that in humans is encoded by the MKNK2 gene.

Interactions 

MNK2 has been shown to interact with MAPK1 and Eukaryotic translation initiation factor 4 gamma.

MNK2 has been identified as a therapeutic target for diabetes. Specifically, blocking MNK2 interaction with eIF4G has been shown to boost protein synthesis and promote beta cell regeneration.

References

Further reading 

 
 
 
 
 
 
 
 
 
 
 

EC 2.7.11